Greatest Hits is a compilation album by Steely Dan, released in 1978. It has sold over two million units in the US.

The double album includes tracks from the band's first six studio albums and includes a previously unreleased song, "Here at the Western World", which was recorded during the sessions for The Royal Scam but not included on that album.

Track listing
All songs by Walter Becker and Donald Fagen except where noted.

Charts

Certifications

References

1978 greatest hits albums
ABC Records compilation albums
Albums produced by Gary Katz
Steely Dan compilation albums